Karhuha (Karḫuḫa), also known as Karḫuḫi, was the tutelary god of the ancient city of Carchemish. He was associated with deer, and it is presumed his character was similar to that of Hittite Kurunta. He is first attested in texts from the second half of the second millennium BCE, and there is no agreement among researchers if he was a Hurrian god in origin or if similarly to closely associated goddess Kubaba he predated Hurrian control over the region. He appears in a variety of Hittite and Luwian texts, and continued to be worshiped through the first millennium BCE.

Name, character and iconography
Karhuha's name was written as dKar-ḫu-ḫa or dKar-ḫu-u-ḫi-iš in cuneiform, reflecting the spelling Karḫuḫa, with a variant form Karḫuḫi, but the breves are often omitted in modern literature. The name could also be represented by the logogram dLAMMA and analogously by CERVUS in Luwian hieroglyphs, which according to Piotr Taracha might have resulted in portraying Karhuha as a god standing on a stag, similar to Kurunta, also represented by these symbols in writing. Volkert Haas outright describes these two deities as identical. Alfonso Archi accepts some of their characteristics might have been similar, but argues they should be kept separate, and points out they were worshiped separately in Malatya. 

The character of Karhuha has been described as warlike. It has also been argued that he was associated with game animals.

On a limestone stela discovered in Malatya, Karhuha, identified by name by the accompanying hieroglyphic Luwian inscription, is portrayed as an armed deity, with a curved blade hanging from his belt, a spear in his right hand and an unidentified three-pronged object in his left hand. Since depictions of many Luwian gods with the last of these attributes are known, it is unlikely to be a symbolic representation of lightning, as sometimes suggested, and might instead be a type of plant. He stands on a lion, while the other deity depicted on the same object, Kubaba, stands on a stag, which apparently represents an exchange of symbolic animals between them.

Worship
Karhuha is first attested in sources of from the middle of the fourteenth century BCE. Gianni Marchesi and Marchetti maintain that he was a Hurrian deity in origin, and that he entered the local pantheon of Carchemish when it was under the control of the Mitanni Empire. However, according to Alfonso Archi, similarly to Kubaba he predated the period of Hurrian control over this city. He was one of the two main deities in the local pantheon, the other being Kubaba. Archi assumes they were envisioned as a couple. Karhuha functioned as the city god, but due to lack of attestations predating the second half of the second millennium BCE, it is not likely that he can be identified with Il-Karkamis ("the god of Carchemish"), a byname of a deity associated with Carchemish in the Old Babylonian period. Most likely, at the time the city god was instead Mesopotamian Nergal. 

The dLAMMA deity mentioned in Deeds of Šuppiluliuma I is presumed to be Karhuha. This text states that the king restored the temples of said god and Kubaba.

An inscription of one of the first millennium BCE kings of Carchemish, Katuwa (reigned c. 880 BCE) mentions a procession involving Karhuha and Kubaba. Another text from his reign mentions offerings made to both of these deities and Tarhunza. A curse formula invokes this group of three alongside the sun, the moon and Parakaras, presumed to be a late form of Pinikir, possibly functioning as a representation of Venus in this context. A different curse formula invoking Karhuha, Kubaba and Santa has also been identified on an unprovenanced bowl fragment.

Karhuha is mentioned alongside Kubaba among the foreign (ie. non-Mesopotamian) deities invoked in a section of the treaty between the Assyrian king Ashur-nirari V and Mati-El, the Aramean ruler of Arpad in Bit Agusi.

Mythology
Alfonso Archi suggests that the Hurrian myth Song of dLAMMA originated in Carchemish, possibly specifically during the period when the city was under Mitanni control, and involved Karhuha, though he presumed that in the known Hittite version of dLAMMA was read as Kurunta, similarly to how Tarḫunna served as a stand-in for Teshub. In this composition, a god designated by the logogram dLAMMA temporarily becomes the king of the gods after defeating Teshub and Shaushka, but eventually proves to be unsuitable for this position, and after ignoring Kubaba's suggestion he is deposed, and later ends up subjugated by the weather god he displaced earlier.

References

Bibliography

Luwian gods
Hurrian deities
Hittite deities